The New York City Food Riot of 1917 were a series of demonstrations and riots which began on February 19, 1917, after a mob composed mostly of women confronted store and pushcart owners over the raising of prices following the shortages of World War I.

History
Ida Harris, president of the socialist Mothers Vigilance Committee, and anarchist labour organizer Marie Ganz, led the crowds through Manhattan's Lower East Side. After another gathering on February 20, Ganz was arrested for "failing to comply with orders to stop stirring up the crowd."

On February 22, the women stormed the city's poultry markets, assaulting customers and destroying chickens.

On February 24, thousands of New Yorkers marched on Madison Square, where "several high-profile speakers addressed the crowd."

The riots were effective in that "by the beginning of March, the city responded to the crisis by securing thousands of pounds of low-cost produce and wholesalers lowered prices." Although this succeeded in ending the riots, food prices continued to "fluctuate sharply throughout the war."

See also
List of incidents of civil unrest in New York City

References

Food Riot
1917 riots
Battles and conflicts without fatalities
Food riots
Riots and civil disorder in New York City
Political riots in the United States